Sir Alan Buxhull  K.G. (died 2 November 1381) was an English soldier and nobleman.

Biography

Knight of the Garter, Constable of the Tower of London and Captain of St Saveur Le Viscomte Castle in Normandy during the 100 Years War.

Alan married Maud Francis, who was the richest woman in England. Maud Francis, Countess of Salisbury They had a son, also called Sir Alan Buxhull. His father died in 1325, when Alan was only 2 years old. (Maud Francis became the foster mother of the future Henry V and her future descendants include Anne Boleyn). The younger Sir Alan was the half brother of Thomas Montagu, 4th Earl of Salisbury and fought alongside him at the Battle of Verneuil.

Buxhill was chamberlain of the Royal household from around 1369 to 1370 and a knight of the chamber.

Buxhull was a deputy in Robert Knolles army during the Hundred Years War, although there is evidence to suggest that this was a shared command. He took command of the fortified abbey of St Maur in 1370 and fought in the Battle of Pontvallain the same year. He was sufficiently important among Knolles's captains that the historian Jonathan Sumption has suggested that Buxhill's departure was the spark that led to the disintegration of Knolles's army. He was later placed in command of Saint-Sauveur-le-Vicomte in Normandy, where he later claimed to have expended a large sum—more than he could account for—on paying ransoms of English prisoners. He subsequently complained that he had to spend over 3,000 francs on "the payment of the ransoms of several bankrupt prisoners who had been captured by the French on different occasions".  He was created a Knight of the Garter in 1372.

He took part in the naval expedition to France in 1374.

Buxhull was described by Froissart as "right valiant Knight" and an "uncommonly able man".

King Edward III became ill in his later years, and the historian G. L. Harriss has argued that it was men such as Buxhull—of the household and physically close to the King—who "manipulated his authority" by regulating who was allowed to see him, and thus controlled the royal patronage.

Marriage and issue
He married firstly a woman with the surname of Bigwood, they are known to had the following issue.
Elizabeth Buxhull, married Roger Lynde, had issue.
Amice Buxhull, married firstly John Beverley and secondly to Robert Bardolf, had issue for both marriages.

His second marriage was to Maud Francis, the widow of John Aubrey, she was a daughter of Adam Francis and Agnes Chaumpneys. Maud was the richest woman in England. A son Alan was born posthumously in 1382 and would later grow up to knighted in turn and the half brother of Thomas Earl of Montague. After her husband's death Maud became the wife of the Earl of Montague, and the foster mother of Henry V.

The second Sir Alan therefore became the brother of Thomas Montagu, 4th Earl of Salisbury, and also was the uncle of Alice Montacute, 5th Countess of Salisbury (d. 1463), the wife of Richard Neville, 5th Earl of Salisbury (d. 1460) and the mother of Warwick the Kingmaker.

Notes

Citations

References

Further reading
Buxhull, Alan (DNB00)
Beltz, George Frederick. Memorials of the Order of the Garter: From Its Foundation to the Present Time; with Biographical Notices of the Knights in the Reigns of Edward III and Richard II. William Pickering, 1841. 

Year of birth unknown
1381 deaths
14th-century English people
English soldiers
14th-century military history of the Kingdom of England
Place of birth missing
Garter Knights appointed by Edward III